The Coupe de France 1991–92 was its 75th edition. For the first time since its creation, the final was unplayed due to 18 people being killed after a temporary stand collapsed during the semi-final game between SC Bastia and Olympique de Marseille. Thus, the trophy was not awarded that season.

Round of 16

Quarter-finals

Semi-finals

References

French federation
1991–92 Coupe de France at ScoreShelf.com

1991–92 domestic association football cups
 
1991-92